The Def Leppard World Tour was a tour by English rock band Def Leppard in support of their self-titled album. The tour started with 13 dates in Canada through April and May. The end of May and beginning of June was spent playing 12 dates in Europe before Def Leppard returned to the United States for 48 dates with Styx and Tesla from June to October.

History
Announcements of the first dates of the tour began in December 2014 when Def Leppard announced a 13 date tour of Canada in the April and May 2015. It will be the band's first tour of Canada since their 2008 Songs from the Sparkle Lounge Tour. The Canadian tour is to be followed by 12 dates and festivals in Europe from May to June.
On February 12, 2015 Def Leppard announced 48 dates touring the US with Styx and Tesla. Joe Elliott and other members of the band have stated that the North American Tour would extend to a full world tour to follow through December 2015, with a cruise and second Las Vegas residency planned for early 2016.
On March 27, 2015, Def Leppard announced the "Let's Get Rocked in the Still of the Night II" tour of the United Kingdom and Ireland with Whitesnake in December 2015.

Setlist
Canadian leg setlist. Most of the songs performed are standards that the band performs on most or all of their tours, however there were two less commonly performed songs from the Euphoria album that were pulled out for this tour. The song "Promises" was included along with "Paper Sun", which was played for the first time since its initial airings during the Euphoria Tour in 2000.

"Let's Go" (after Oct 7)
"Rock! Rock! (Till You Drop)" (dropped after 18 November)
"Animal"
"Dangerous" (added in 18 November)
"Let It Go" (added on the 4th show, in Dawson Creek, BC)
"Foolin'"
"Promises"
"Paper Sun"
"Love Bites"
"Armageddon It"
"Rock On"
"Two Steps Behind"
"Rocket"
"Bringin' On the Heartbreak"
"Switch 625"
"Hysteria"
"Let's Get Rocked"
"Pour Some Sugar on Me"
Encore
"Rock of Ages"
"Photograph"

Tour dates

Gross

The tour grossed US$54 million, with 992,099 tickets sold at 96 concerts.

Personnel
Def Leppard
Rick Savage – bass, backing vocals
Joe Elliott – lead vocals
Rick Allen – drums, percussion, backing vocals
Phil Collen – guitar, backing vocals
Vivian Campbell – guitar, backing vocals

Touring members
Steve Brown – guitar, backing vocals (filled-in for Vivian Campbell on June 23, June 25 and June 27, 2015)

References 

Def Leppard concert tours
2015 concert tours